Jacques Belhomme (17 June 1737 – 18 September 1824) was a personality of the French Revolution and the owner of the Pension Belhomme.  He appears in the 1951 film Dear Caroline after the novel by Jacques Laurent.

Life
A joiner in the village of Charonne, he was made the holder of the "pension bourgeoise", precursor to the clinics and rest homes of today, then a gaoler when the Jacobins sent prisoners there from the end of 1793.

He gained fame for a scandal that broke out just after his death, when the comte de Sainte-Aulaire prepared for the press an article accusing Belhomme of having profited from the Reign of Terror to ransom rich suspects. As ever, the reality was more subtle.

References
 Frédéric Lenormand, La pension Belhomme, une prison de luxe sous la Terreur, Paris, Fayard, 2002.

1737 births
1824 deaths
People of the French Revolution
Burials at Père Lachaise Cemetery